Apache Phoenix is an open source, massively parallel, relational database engine supporting OLTP for Hadoop using Apache HBase as its backing store. Phoenix provides a JDBC driver that hides the intricacies of the NoSQL store enabling users to create, delete, and alter SQL tables, views, indexes, and sequences; insert and delete rows singly and in bulk; and query data through SQL. Phoenix compiles queries and other statements into native NoSQL store APIs rather than using MapReduce enabling the building of low latency applications on top of NoSQL stores.

History
Phoenix began as an internal project by the company salesforce.com out of a need to support a higher level, well understood, SQL language. It was originally open-sourced on GitHub on 28 Jan 2014 and became a top-level Apache project on 22 May 2014. Apache Phoenix is included in the Cloudera Data Platform 7.0 and above, Hortonworks distribution for HDP 2.1 and above, is available as part of Cloudera labs, and is part of the Hadoop ecosystem.

See also
Apache HBase
Apache Hadoop

References

External links
Official Apache Phoenix homepage
Official Apache Phoenix blog

Free software
Phoenix
Relational database management systems